The Samsung Galaxy A20s is an entry level smartphone developed by Samsung Electronics announced on September 23, 2019, and released to the general public on October 5, 2019. It was discontinued on January 16, 2023.

Specifications

Hardware 
 Chipset - Snapdragon 450
 Clock Speed - Octa-Core @ 1.80 GHz
 Cores - Octa-Core
 GPU - Adreno 506

Memory

 RAM/ROM sizes - 3 GB RAM with 32 GB ROM or 4 GB RAM with 64 GB ROM
 External memory support - Yes
 External memory support maximum - 512 GB

Network 
The Samsung Galaxy A20s is compatible with 2G, 3G, and 4G networks. It supports Wi-Fi, Wi-Fi Direct, Bluetooth, and Mobile Tethering. It also supports a download speed of up to 150 Megabits per second and an upload speed of up to 50 Megabits per second when connected to a Long Term Evolution (LTE) network. The smartphone has a 42.2 Megabits per second download and 5.76 Megabits per second upload speed when connected to 3G. It has Bluetooth version 4.2 and 802.11 2.4 GHz b/g/n Wi-Fi.

Platform 
The system on a chip on the Samsung Galaxy A20s is a 14 nanometer Qualcomm Snapdragon 450 chipset, including the Adreno 506 graphics processing unit.

Display 
The Samsung Galaxy A20s has a TFT capacitive IPS LCD. It has 6.5 inches high definition and a cinematic ratio (19.5:9) display and screen to body ratio of 82%. It has a 264 PPI density of pixels.

Memory 
The Samsung Galaxy A20s comes with 3 GB or 4 GB of LPDDR3 RAM. The 3 GB RAM version has 32 GB ROM storage while the 4 GB RAM version has 64 GB ROM storage. They have a storage type of eMMC version 5.1. The ROM storage can be expanded up to 512 GB as external memory using a microSD card (and the smartphone supports UHS-I speed).

Camera 
The Samsung Galaxy A20s has three rear cameras. The wide camera is 13 megapixels, the ultrawide camera is 8 megapixels and the depth camera is 5 megapixels. The front camera is also an 8.0-megapixel wide camera.

Battery 
The Samsung Galaxy A20s includes a 4000 mAh battery and supports 15W fast charging.

Software 
The Samsung Galaxy A20s comes preinstalled with Android 9 Pie and One UI core version 1.0 and can be updated to Android 11 with One UI core version 3.1.

References

Samsung smartphones
Samsung Galaxy
Android (operating system) devices
Mobile phones introduced in 2019
Mobile phones with multiple rear cameras